Stocks Mill is a Grade II* listed post mill in Wittersham on the Isle of Oxney, in Kent, England which has been preserved.

History

Probably built around 1781, it was named Stocks Mill after the village stocks that stood nearby. The mill may be older and may have been moved from Stone in Oxney, with the date 1781 carved into the main post denoting its re-erection. The Mill House was at one time used as the parish Poorhouse. The mill was last worked circa 1900, and was then preserved by Norman Forbes-Robertson, who owned the mill and Mill House. The mill passed into the ownership of the artist Randolph H Sauter. and then Sir Edward Parry. The mill was repaired in 1958, and in 1968 a new stock and pair of sails was fitted by the millwright Derek Ogden. In 1980, the mill was acquired by Kent County Council and the Friends of Stocks Mill was set up to allow the mill to be opened to the public. The mill underwent a restoration programme starting in 2002 and partly funded by the National Lottery, which included two new sails amongst other work. Some of the milling machinery which had been removed over the years was recreated. The mill was reopened to the public in 2004.

Description

Stocks Mill is a post mill on a single storey roundhouse. It has four Spring sails mounted on a wooden windshaft with a cast iron poll end. This carries a  diameter wooden Head Wheel with 120 cogs, and  a  diameter Tail Wheel. The mill drove two pairs of millstones.

Millers

Thomas Venus 1772 - 1786
Henry Munk 1786
Thomas Howards 1792
Turner 1825 - 1831
Richard Parton 1838
John Grampton 1841
William Grampton 1841
William Proctor 1851
John Spilstead 1851
Patric Cummins 1851 - 1861
George Weller 1856
Robert Parton
Peter Parton
G Burch
H S Hyland
S Birch
Thomas W Collard 1870
John Holdstock 1889 (owner, miller?)
Pilbeam 1892 (occupier, miller?)

References for above:-

References

External links

Windmill World page on the mill.
Visiting information

Windmills in Kent
Post mills in the United Kingdom
Grade II* listed buildings in Kent
Windmills completed in 1781
Museums in the Borough of Ashford
Mill museums in England